Johann "Hans" Lindner (born 3 May 1959 in Tragail, Paternion, Carinthia) is a retired hammer thrower from Austria, who represented his native country in three consecutive Summer Olympics, starting in 1984. He also competed at the Winter Olympics, in 1984 as a bobsledder.

Achievements

References
 

1959 births
Living people
People from Villach-Land
Austrian male hammer throwers
Austrian male bobsledders
Bobsledders at the 1984 Winter Olympics
Athletes (track and field) at the 1984 Summer Olympics
Athletes (track and field) at the 1988 Summer Olympics
Athletes (track and field) at the 1992 Summer Olympics
Olympic athletes of Austria
Olympic bobsledders of Austria
Sportspeople from Carinthia (state)